Platynodes westermanni is a species of beetle in the family Carabidae, the only species in the genus Platynodes.

References

Pterostichinae